Edward Bellasis  (14 October 1800 – 24 January 1873) was an English lawyer, a follower of the Oxford Movement who converted to Roman Catholicism. He was a close friend and associate of other Anglo-Catholic lawyers Edward Lowth Badeley and James Hope-Scott. His son, also named Edward Bellasis became an eminent genealogist.

References
Matthew, H. C. G. (2006) "Bellasis, Edward (1800–1873)", Oxford Dictionary of National Biography, Oxford University Press, online edn, accessed 23 July 2007 

Attribution

1800 births
1873 deaths
English Anglo-Catholics
Converts to Roman Catholicism from Anglicanism
English Roman Catholics
Serjeants-at-law (England)
19th-century English lawyers